San Pedro River is a river in Valdivia Province, southern Chile. It drains waters from the Riñihue Lake, the last of the Seven Lakes, to the Calle-Calle River, which in turn changes name to Valdivia River and at the end outflows in Corral Bay. San Pedro River is well known for being a good fishing area and a good place to practise rafting.

Central San Pedro is a controversial hydroelectrical dam project in the river.

References

Rivers of Chile
Rivers of Los Ríos Region